Maksym Volodymyrovych Tyapkin (born 5 January 2001) is a Ukrainian professional footballer who plays as a right winger for Ukrainian First League club LNZ Cherkasy.

References

External links
 
 

2001 births
Living people
Sportspeople from Dnipropetrovsk Oblast
Ukrainian footballers
Association football forwards
FC Dnipro players
SC Dnipro-1 players
FC Nikopol players
FC LNZ Cherkasy players
Ukrainian First League players
Ukrainian Second League players
Ukrainian Amateur Football Championship players